John Elliot Cowdin (March 22, 1858 – January 7, 1941)  was an American polo player.

Early life and career
Cowdin was born on March 22, 1858, to Elliot Christopher Cowdin and Sarah Katharine Waldron. His father was a prominent New York businessman and a member of the 100th New York State Legislature.

Cowdin  played for the Rockaway Polo Club. He won the 1902 International Polo Cup and the first U.S. Open Polo Championship in 1904. He also won the Association and Added Cups, the Governor's Challenge Cup and the Senior Championship in 1896, 1899, 1902 and 1903.

His wife died on May 3, 1908, after a short illness while in Paris, France.
  
He married Gertrude Cheever with whom he had a daughter and two sons. In 1912, his second marriage was to Madeleine Knowlton.

He died on January 7, 1941.

Legacy
He was inducted into the Museum of Polo and Hall of Fame in 2007. One of his sons, John Cheever Cowdin, was also a top level polo player.

References

1858 births
1941 deaths
People from Manhattan
Sportspeople from Boston
Harvard University alumni
Businesspeople from New York (state)
American polo players
International Polo Cup
People from Gramercy Park